Canterbury School is an independent, college preparatory day school for students aged 2 through Grade 12. The school is located in Fort Wayne, Indiana (U.S.). As of 2020, Canterbury School is ranked as the third-best private school in Indiana.

History
Canterbury was established in 1977, by several families, and others. Canterbury School opened at Trinity Episcopal Church in downtown Fort Wayne. It was a nondenominational, self-supported school with 89 students in kindergarten to grade 6. It sought to inspire and motivate students while instilling Christian values and morals, cultivating an appreciation for the fine arts, developing foreign language skills, and setting high standards for teaching and learning. It continued to grow and within three years, it outgrew its church setting. In 1980, it relocated to the vacant Fort Wayne Community Schools building on Covington Road. When Jonathan Hancock arrived as the fourth headmaster in 1983, he oversaw Canterbury’s expansion to grade 12. In 1987, the year the first seniors graduated from Canterbury, the school grew yet again, opening a campus for grades 9 to 12 on Smith Road. Programs for students as young as 2 were added that year, providing opportunities for children of every age to meet and embrace the educational challenges envisioned by those caring and dedicated parents who first served as an example of what can be achieved. In 2007-2008, the school expanded both campuses.

Academics
Canterbury's "goal is to inspire each student to discover and develop his or her unique strengths and talents, and support his or her growth and development tirelessly". Classes throughout all grades, including the high school, are intentionally small, providing for more individual help and one-on-one relationships with teachers. Classes are conducted in a 1-to-1 technology environment. The school strives to teach students not only the subjects they take but also how to be lifelong learners and build one's character. 100% of outgoing Canterbury students are admitted into college.

Arts
As opposed to the national trend of steering away from the arts, Canterbury's programs have held fast. Art classes include "drama, choir, photography, computer art, music technology, and composition, orchestra, band, dance, theatre history, and more". Recently, Canterbury has established an Academy of the Arts program where students meet in school weekly to show individually prepared works in their respective pursuits. This is overseen by assigned teacher mentors trained in those art forms. Other extracurricular art activities are very popular as well.

Athletics
Sports are encouraged among students. All teams have no-cut policies, so everyone who tries out will make the team. The school is part of the Positive Coaching Alliance.

Canterbury's athletic programs have been highly successful over the years. The boys' soccer team holds the record for IHSAA state championships at 7 championship teams, winning the state championship in 1997-98, 1998-99, and 2001-02 school years and winning Class A state championships in the 2011-12, 2012-13, 2017-18, and 2018-19 school years, while coming state runner-ups in 1996-97, 2002-03, and 2020-21 school years.

The girl's basketball team has also had its fair share of success, winning Class A state championships in the 2007-08, 2008-09, 2009-10, 2011-12, and 2012-13 school years and coming state runner-ups after being moved up to Class 2A in the 2013-14 and 2014-15 school years.

The girl's soccer team won Class A state championships in the 2014-15 and 2015-16 school years.

The girl's track team has won two individual 1600m state titles.

The tennis team had a boys' state runner-up doubles team in the 2005-06 school year and a girl's singles runner-up in the 2011-12 school year.

See also
 List of high schools in Indiana
 Fort Wayne, Indiana

References

External links
 Canterbury School

Educational institutions established in 1977
Private high schools in Indiana
Schools in Fort Wayne, Indiana
IHSAA Conference-Independent Schools
Private middle schools in Indiana
Private elementary schools in Indiana
Preparatory schools in Indiana
1977 establishments in Indiana